Mustafa Mohamed Zarti (born 1970) was vice chairman of Libya's $65 billion sovereign wealth fund.

References

Living people
1970 births